Albano Sant'Alessandro is a comune in the province of Bergamo, in Lombardy, Italy.

The coat of arms of Albano Sant'Alessandro shows a silver star on yellow on the left and a golden soldier (Saint Alexander of Bergamo) on red on the right.

Bounding comuni
Torre de' Roveri
San Paolo d'Argon
Montello
Bagnatica
Brusaporto
Seriate
Pedrengo

References

External links
 Albano Sant'Alessandro 
 Ciriguarda.info: Community web site created by people living in Albano Sant'Alessandro